Mylothris jaopura, Karsch's dotted border, is a butterfly in the family Pieridae. It is found in Ivory Coast, Ghana, Togo, southern Nigeria, western Cameroon and possibly Liberia. The habitat consists of forests and occasionally dense Guinea savanna. It is also found in disturbed habitats such as suburban gardens.

The larvae feed on Loranthaceae species.

References

Butterflies described in 1893
Pierini
Butterflies of Africa